Miatta Fahnbulleh may refer to:

 Miatta Fahnbulleh (economist), a Liberia-born British economist
 Miatta Fahnbulleh (singer), a Liberian singer and human rights activist